The Kumaratunga cabinet was the central government of Sri Lanka led by President Chandrika Kumaratunga between 1994 and 2005. It was formed in November 1994 when Kumaratunga was elected president and it ended in November 2005 when her second limited term ended. The Kumaratunga cabinet saw the only significant period of co-habitation in Sri Lanka since the executive presidency was introduced in 1978. Between 2001 and 2004 President Kumaratunga, leader of the Sri Lanka Freedom Party/People's Alliance, had to share power with her opponents, the United National Party/United National Front.

Cabinet members

Project ministers

Deputy ministers

Notes

References

1994 establishments in Sri Lanka
2005 disestablishments in Sri Lanka
Cabinets established in 1994
Cabinets disestablished in 2005
Cabinet of Sri Lanka